Donald Wilson McGowan (August 30, 1899 – September 24, 1967) was a United States Army Major General who served as commander of the 50th Armored Division and Chief of the National Guard Bureau.

Early life
McGowan was born on August 30, 1899, in Orange, New Jersey.  He graduated from high school in Orange in 1916, and enlisted in the New Jersey National Guard's Company I, 5th Infantry Regiment.  He served with his regiment in Texas during the Pancho Villa Expedition.

World War I
McGowan was promoted to Sergeant Major of the 114th Infantry Regiment, 29th Infantry Division in 1918.  He served in Europe, and took part in the Meuse-Argonne and Alsace campaigns.  In late 1918 the Army asked commanders to recommend students from the ranks for attendance at the United States Military Academy, and McGowan's brigade commander, John McAuley Palmer, recommended him.  McGowan attended West Point from 1919 to 1922, but resigned without graduating and returned to the New Jersey National Guard.

Post World War I
In 1922 McGowan received a commission as a Second Lieutenant.  He held a variety of command and staff positions as he advanced through the ranks, primarily with the 44th Infantry Division.  In 1935 he graduated from the United States Army Command and General Staff College.  He was a Lieutenant Colonel when he served as New Jersey's Assistant Adjutant General from 1936 to 1941.

World War II
In 1941 he was appointed to command of the 102nd Cavalry Regiment.  He served in Europe, and participated in the D-Day assault on Omaha Beach.

Later in 1944 he was assigned as Provost Marshal for the Normandy Base Section, and his responsibilities expanded to include Brittany, the Lower Seine, Belgium and the Netherlands.
After the war McGowan returned to his position as New Jersey's Assistant Adjutant General.  He was subsequently appointed Deputy Chief of Staff of the New Jersey Department of Defense.

Post World War II
In 1947 McGowan was promoted to Brigadier General.  From 1948 to 1955 he was commander of the 50th Armored Division as a Major General.

From 1955 to 1959 McGowan was Chief of the Army Division at the National Guard Bureau.
In 1959 he was named Chief of the National Guard Bureau, and he served until 1963.

During his tenure the National Guard successfully mobilized more than 65,000 members during the Berlin Crisis of 1961.  In addition, the number of state Officer Candidate Schools increased from 5 to 51.  The National Guard also converted its anti-aircraft weapons to Nike-Ajax and Hercules missiles and organized its first Special Forces units.

At his retirement McGowan was the last known Villa Expedition veteran to still be serving in the U.S. military.

Awards and decorations
McGowan's awards and decorations included the Distinguished Service Medal (U.S. Army), and the Bronze Star Medal (2).

Retirement and death
After retiring from the military McGowan served as president of the United States Armor Association.  He died at his home in Lawrence Township, Mercer County, New Jersey on September 24, 1967 from the effects of self-inflicted gunshot wounds.  He was buried in Arlington National Cemetery, Section 3, Site 2067-E.

Family
McGowan was married to Helen Margaret S. Schoeffel.  They had four sons and one daughter, and all the sons all served in the military.  Their daughter Margaret graduated from the University of Vermont and was a teacher in Vergennes and a writing instructor at the University of New Hampshire.

Donald McGowan (died December 15, 1966) was a career member of the New Jersey Army National Guard.

Colonel Robert Silber "Bob" McGowan (died February 4, 2001) graduated from West Point in 1952 and served as an aide to General Maxwell D. Taylor.  He served 3 tours in Vietnam, including one as commander of 3d Squadron, 4th Cavalry, 25th Infantry Division.  He was the most decorated member of his West Point class, and his awards included: Distinguished Service Cross; Silver Star (4); Legion of Merit; Distinguished Flying Cross (2); Bronze Star Medal with V for Valor (5), and Purple Heart (3).

John "Jay" McGowan flew helicopters as a casualty evacuation pilot during the Vietnam War.  After his military service he flew for the Port Authority of New York and New Jersey, serving as chief pilot of the authority's police helicopter operation until retiring shortly after the September 11, 2001 terrorist attacks.

After his military service Duncan McGowan became an architect in Concord, New Hampshire.  He and his artist wife Mary raised two daughters, one who became an architect and one who became professor of South Asian studies at the University of Vermont.

References

External links

1899 births
1967 deaths
People from Lawrence Township, Mercer County, New Jersey
People from Orange, New Jersey
United States Army personnel of World War I
United States Army personnel of World War II
United States Army generals
National Guard (United States) generals
United States Army Command and General Staff College alumni
Recipients of the Distinguished Service Medal (US Army)
Chiefs of the National Guard Bureau
Military personnel from New Jersey
Suicides by firearm in New Jersey
Multiple gunshot suicides